Radio London (in Italian Radio Londra) was the name used in Italy for the radio broadcasts of the British Broadcasting Corporation (BBC), starting from 27 September 1938, aimed at the populations of German-dominated continental Europe.

The idea may have come from the Italians themselves, as the Arabic-language broadcasts received from Radio Bari in southern Italy were very popular in the Middle East and North Africa, where British and French influence was predominant and where they soon acquired an attentive and interested audience in the local upper middle class.

The BBC's Italian-language broadcasts began with the Munich crisis. With the outbreak of hostilities in 1939, Radio Londons broadcasts increased, reaching 4.15 hours in 1943.

The success of Radio London'''s broadcasts was because the British War Office, instead of managing their propaganda broadcasts directly, had entrusted them to a self-governing body, the BBC, which was already well known for its independent journalistic style, with news kept separate from comments.Radio Londons editorial staff became famous for their timeliness in transmitting information around the world, with a direct and pragmatic, typically British style. The BBC Italian Service was marked by the charismatic personality of Harold Stevens - famous in Italy as Colonnello Buonasera (in English Colonel Good Evening) - a British military officer who had lived in Rome and who, through his calm and reasonable comments, very different from Fascist rhetoric, conveyed a sense of serenity and hope in the future.

"Candidus" (the pseudonym of John Marus) was another charismatic figure of Radio London, who, with his relentless dialectical skills, contrasted the attempts of Nazi-Fascist propaganda to distort the reality and seriousness of the situation.Radio London's role in the war also became crucial in sending special messages, drafted by the Allied High Command, for Italian resistance groups.Radio London's broadcasts were opened by the first notes of Beethoven's 5th Symphony (probably because they represented the letter "V" in Morse code, which evoked the idea of "V" for "Victory", also strongly associated with the British Prime Minister Winston Churchill).

The BBC continued its broadcasts in Italian with a nightly programme called L'Ora di Londra (London's Hour'') until 31 December 1981, when it was cut, despite the protests of many listeners. At least one hundred thousand Italians had apparently retained the habit of listening to the BBC until then.

See also 
 
Radio Londres (to France)
Radio Milano-Libertà, the Soviet equivalent during WWII

Bibliography 
Maura Piccialuti Caprioli - Radio Londra 1939-1945. Inventario delle trasmissioni per l'Italia

References

External links 
 Audio of Colonel Harold Stevens - Radio London to the Italians, from the website Rai Teche - format: RealMedia
 Audio of the "special messages" - Radio London to the Italians, from the website Rai Teche - format: RealMedia
 Dedicated BBC website: 
 Website in Italian: Gli anni di Radio Londra

World War II propaganda
Radio stations in Italy
United Kingdom in World War II
BBC World Service foreign language
BBC history
Defunct radio stations in the United Kingdom
Italian resistance movement
Radio stations established in 1938
Special Operations Executive
Radio during World War II
Radio stations disestablished in 1981
Defunct mass media in Italy